Anniken Obaidli (born 22 June 1995) is a Norwegian handball player who plays for Storhamar HE.

She also represented Norway in 2014 Women's Junior World Handball Championship, placing 9th.

Achievements 
Youth European Championship:
Bronze Medalist: 2011
World Youth Championship:
Bronze Medalist: 2012
Norwegian League
 Silver: 2021/2022

Individual awards
 Eliteserien's "public favorite": 2019/2020
 NISO Best Young Player of the Year: 2015/2016
 Best Rookie of Grundigligaen: 2015/2016

References

1995 births
Living people
People from Molde
Norwegian female handball players
Sportspeople from Møre og Romsdal
21st-century Norwegian women